Christian Bautista  is the debut album by Filipino singer Christian Bautista, released in the Philippines on March 26, 2004, by Warner Music Philippines. Its singles include "The Way You Look at Me", "Hands to Heaven", "Colour Everywhere", "Kailan Pa Ma'y Ikaw" and "Kelan Kaya". To date, the album has reached 4× Platinum status by the Philippine Association of the Record Industry, selling over 120,000 units in the country. It has also been certified in other Southeast Asian countries, such as Indonesia and Thailand.

The album was released on digital download through iTunes and Amazon.com on 25 September 2004. It has sold more than 400,000 copies all over Asia.

Background 
After his stint as a contestant on ABS-CBN's Star in a Million talent contest where he became the fourth runner-up, Bautista signed an album contract with Warner Music Philippines. He, then, released his self-titled debut album, with "The Way You Look at Me" as its first single, written by Andrew Fromm and Keith Follese.

The album had significant radio airplay in other Southeast Asian countries such as Indonesia, Thailand, Malaysia and Singapore.

Reception 

The album sold overwhelmingly well. It was 4× platinum in the Philippines and 2× platinum in Indonesia. Furthermore, it became popular in other parts of Southeast Asia, namely Thailand and Malaysia. Despite of over-performing commercially, the album received mixed reviews from OPM critics. Ginnie Faustino-Galgana of Titik Pilipino gave the album three out of five stars, stating "He is a face with a voice. It's easy to imagine girls swooning over Christian. If he could act, he can do a Piolo Pascual". However, she felt the lack of heart on Bautista's deliverance, saying "He can hit the notes and his delivery is pretty clear, but more emotion is needed [...] He may want to croon, rather than just sing the words". She ended the review unsatisfied, saying "A little more practice will get him that oomph".

Re-release 
A limited edition of the album was released, consisting of a two-CD set package. The first disc consists of the original tracks from the original edition of the album plus four additional songs—"You and Me (We Wanted It All)" with Rachelle Ann Go, "So It's You", "Say That You Love Me", and "I Will Be What I Believe". The second disc is in VCD format, consisting of six music videos.

Critical response 
Titik Pilipino gave another review for the re-release of Christian Bautista. Resty Odon gave the album a perfect rating (five out of five stars), stating "The good news is, the addition of these four numbers gives Christian the chance to further prove that he can hold his own in the ballads department". He compared Bautista as better than Josh Groban, when it comes to pop numbers. He also praised the vocal performance of Bautista on the four new songs, saying "Fans of Christian Bautista [...] will be thrilled just the same to find Christian belting it out in four new songs in his own unique style, including a duet with the golden-voiced Rachelle Ann Go.

Track listing 
All tracks were produced by Neil C. Gregorio.

Standard edition 
 "The Way You Look at Me" (Keith Follese, Andrew Fromm) – 3:27
 "Colour Everywhere" (Guy Roche, Shelly Peiken) – 4:12
 "Kailan Pa Ma'y Ikaw" (Tito C. Cayamada) – 3:58
 "Away from You" (Boy Katindig) – 4:18
 "Kelan Kaya" (Emil Pama) – 4:32
 "Hands to Heaven" (David Glasper, Marcus Lilington) – 4:07
 "Ang Tangi Kong Kasama" (Cayamada, Jerry Butiong) – 4:09
 "Miracle" (featuring Nina) (Mike Luis) – 4:06
 "The Way You Look at Me" (Acoustic) (Follese, Fromm) – 3:27
 "I Don't Want to See You Cry Again" (Jungee Marcelo, Soc Villanueva) – 5:31

Limited edition 
Bonus tracks
 "You and Me (We Wanted It All)" (with Rachelle Ann Go) (Peter Allen, Carol Bayer-Sager) – 4:32
 "So It's You" (Cecille Azarcon) – 3:42
 "Say That You Love Me" (Louie Ocampo, Alan Ayque) – 4:51
 "I Will Be What I Believe" (Ferdinand Dimadura) – 3:32
Bonus VCD
 "The Way You Look at Me" (music video)
 "Hands to Heaven" (music video)
 "Colour Everywhere" (music video)
 "Kailan Pa Ma'y Ikaw" (music video)
 "You and Me (We Wanted It All)" (with Rachelle Ann Go) (music video)
 "So It's You" (music video)

OTHERS
 "To Have and to Hold" (with Sitti) (Claudine Barreto and Raymart Santiago's Wedding)

Personnel 
Credits were taken from Titik Pilipino.

 Christian Bautista - lead vocals, back-up vocals
 Rey Cortez (of WMP Creative) - album cover art
 Tom Epperson - photography
 Mon Faustino - arranger
 Keith Follese - arranger
 Andrew Fromm - arranger
 Chris Genuino (of WMP Creative) - album cover art
 Neil C. Gregorio - album producer, A&R administration, mastering and sequencing
 Ricky R. Ilacad - executive producer, A&R administration
 Mike Luis - vocal coach, arranger
 Ferdie Marquez - arranger
 Nina - lead vocals (track 8)
 Alvin Nunez - arranger
 Anne Poblador - styling
 Frey Zambrano - production coordinator
 Paolo Zarate - arranger
 Zeebedee Zuniga - vocal coach
 Mastering and sequencing at Warner Chili Red Studio

Certifications

Release history

References 

2004 debut albums
Christian Bautista albums